Tissue Engineering and Regenerative Medicine International Society is an international learned society dedicated to tissue engineering and regenerative medicine.

Background

Regenerative medicine involves processes of replacing, engineering or regenerating human cells, tissues or organs to restore or establish normal function. A major technology of regenerative medicine is tissue engineering, which has variously been defined as "an interdisciplinary field that applies the principles of engineering and the life sciences toward the development of biological substitutes that restore, maintain, or improve tissue function", or "the creation of new tissue by the deliberate and controlled stimulation of selected target cells through a systematic combination of molecular and mechanical signals".

History

Tissue engineering emerged during the 1990s as a potentially powerful option for regenerating tissue and research initiatives were established in various cities in the USA and in European countries including the UK, Italy, Germany and Switzerland, and also in Japan. Soon fledgling societies were formed in these countries in order to represent these new sciences, notably the European Tissue Engineering Society (ETES) and, in the USA, the Tissue Engineering Society (TES), soon to become the Tissue Engineering Society international (TESi) and the Regenerative Medicine Society (RMS).

Because of the overlap between the activities of these societies and the increasing globalization of science and medicine, considerations of a merger between TESI and ETES and RMS were initiated in 2004 and agreement was reached during 2005 about the formation of the consolidated society, the Tissue Engineering and Regenerative Medicine International Society (TERMIS). Election of officers for TERMIS took place in September 2005, and the by-laws were approved by the Board.

Rapid progress in the organization of TERMIS took place during late 2005 and 2006. The SYIS, Student and Young Investigator Section was established in January 2006, website and newsletter launched and membership dues procedures put in place.

Structure and governance
It was determined that each Chapter would have its own Council, the overall activities being determined by the Governing Board, on which each Council was represented, and an Executive Committee.

Society chapters
At the beginning of the Society, it was agreed that there would be Continental Chapters of TERMIS, initially TERMIS-North America (TERMIS-NA) and TERMIS-Europe (TERMIS-EU), to be joined at the time of the major Shanghai conference in October 2005 by TERMIS-Asia Pacific (TERMIS-AP). It was subsequently agreed that the remit of TERMIS-North America should be expanded to incorporate activity in South America, the chapter becoming TERMIS-Americas (TERMS-AM) officially in 2012.

Student and Young Investigator Section
The Student and Young Investigator Section of TERMIS (TERMIS-SYIS) brings together undergraduate and graduate students, post-doctoral researchers and young investigators in industry and academia related to tissue engineering and regenerative medicine.  It follows the organizational and working pattern of TERMIS.

Activities

Journal

A contract was signed between TERMIS and the Mary Ann Liebert publisher which designated the journal Tissue Engineering, Parts A, B, and C as the official journal of TERMIS with free on-line access for the membership.

Conferences
It was agreed that there would be a World Congress every three years, with each Chapter organizing its own conference in the intervening two years.

Awards
Each TERMIS chapter has defined awards to recognize outstanding scientists and their contributions within the community.

TERMIS-AP
 The Excellence Achievement Award has been established to recognize a researcher in the Asia-Pacific region who has made continuous and landmark contributions to the tissue engineering and regenerative medicine field.
 The Outstanding Scientist Award has been established to recognize a mid-career researcher in the Asia-Pacific region who has made significant contributions to the TERM field.
 The Young Scholar Award has been established to recognize a young researcher in the Asia-Pacific region who has made significant and consistent achievements in the TERM field, showing clear evidence of their potential to excel.
 The Mary Ann Liebert, Inc. Best TERM Paper Award has been established to recognize a student researcher (undergraduate/graduate/postdoc) in the Asia-Pacific region who has achieved outstanding research accomplishments in the TERM field.
 The TERMIS-AP Innovation Team Award has been established to recognize a team of researchers in the Asia-Pacific region. It aims to recognize successful applications of tissue engineering and regenerative medicine leading to the development of relevant products/therapies/technologies which will ultimately benefit the patients.

TERMIS-EU
 The Career Achievement Award is aimed towards a recognition of individuals who have made outstanding contributions to the field of TERM and have carried out most of their career in the TERMIS-EU geographical area. 
 The Mid Terms Career Award has been established in 2020 to recognize individuals that are within 10–20 years after obtaining their PhD, with a successful research group and clear evidence of outstanding performance.
 The Robert Brown Early Career Principal Investigator Award recognizes individuals that are within 2–10 years after obtaining their PhD, with clear evidence of a growing profile.

Award recipients

Fellows
Fellows of Tissue Engineering and Regenerative Medicine (FTERM) recipients are:

 Alini, Mauro
 Atala, Anthony 
 Badylak, Stephen 
 Cancedda, Ranieri 
 Cao, Yilin 
 Griffith, Linda 
 Guldberg, Robert 
 Hellman, Kiki 
 Hilborn, Jöns
 Hubbell, Jeffrey 
 Hutmacher, Dietmar 
 Johnson, Peter 
 Khang, Gilson 
 Kirkpatrick, C. James 
 Langer, Robert
 Lee, Hai-Bang 
 Lee, Jin Ho 
 Martin, Ivan 
 Mikos, Antonios 
 Mooney, David 
 Naughton, Gail 
 Nerem, Robert 
 Okano, Teruo 
 Pandit, Abhay
 Parenteau, Nancy 
 Radisic, Milica 
 Ratner, Buddy 
 Redl, Heinz 
 Reis, Rui L. 
 Russell, Alan
 Shoichet, Molly
 Smith, David
 Tabata, Yasuhiko
 Vacanti, Charles
 Vacanti, Joseph
 van Osch, Gerjo
 Vunjak-Novakovic, Gordana
 Wagner, William
 Weiss, Anthony S.
 Williams, David

References

External links
 TERMIS homepage 
 Tissue Engineering Journal

Tissue engineering
Medical associations based in the United States
Medical and health organizations based in California
International medical associations